Wayne "Winger" Kiel (born ) is a Canadian male curler and coach.

As a coach of Canadian wheelchair curling team he participated in 2018 Winter Paralympics.

He started curling in 1960.

He awarded Canadian Curling Association Award of achievement in 1999.

Record as a coach of national teams

References

External links

Wayne Kiel - Coach profile - 2018 Winter Paralympics - International Paralympic Committee
Coach Spotlight: Wayne Kiel dedicates coaching skills to wheelchair curling | Canadian Paralympic Committee

Living people
1949 births
Canadian male curlers
Canadian curling coaches